The New Zealand national korfball team, nicknamed The Korus (though the correct plural for koru is koru.), is the national team representing New Zealand in korfball international competitions. The team is managed by Korfball New Zealand (KNZI). The name The Korus is one of many national team nicknames (indirectly) related to the All Blacks and/or the New Zealand silver tree fern.

Tournament history

Current squad
2022 National team who participated in the IKF Asia Oceania Korfball Championship, 2022

 Coach: Bevan Lawson
 Assistant Coach: Megan Shea
 Manager: Michael J. Hanlon

Youth teams
<small>Korfball New Zealand has also sent away multiple youth teams to represent internationally.

References

External links
 Korfball New Zealand
 Korfball New Zealand

National korfball teams
Korfball
National team